Guy Weizman (born 1973) is an Israel choreographer and director.  Together with his partner Roni Haver, he is artistic director of the dance company Club Guy & Roni in Groningen, the Netherlands.

Since January 2017 Weizman has been artistic and general director of the Dutch theatre company Noord Nederlands Toneel in Groningen.

In 2018 he won the directors award at the Dutch Theater Festival for Salam.

In 2018 Weizman's Noord Nederlands Toneel and Club Guy & Roni started the interdisciplinary movement called NITE together with Asko|Schönberg and Slagwerk Den Haag.

Dance career 
Guy Weizman began his career as a dancer with the Batsheva Dance Company in Tel Aviv. In 2002, after dancing with companies in Berlin, Barcelona and Galili Dance in the Netherlands, he started his own international dance company with Roni Haver in Groningen (NL).

Club Guy & Roni performs innovative contemporary dance pieces in collaboration with other disciplines such as  theatre, literature, film and visual arts.

From January 1, 2017, Weizman  serves as  artistic and general director of the Noord Nederlands Toneel.

Choreographer and director 
 2020 Swan Lake the Game, coproduction Slagwerk Den Haag and Tomoko Mukaiyama Foundation, music by Kordz
 2020 Swan Lake, coproduction Slagwerk Den Haag and Tomoko Mukaiyama Foundation, music by Kordz
 2020 Before/After, coproduction Noord Nederlands Toneel, Slagwerk Den Haag and Asko|Schönberg, music by Luke Deane
 2019 LOVE, coproduction GöteborgsOperans Danskompani, Slagwerk Den Haag and Asko | Schönberg
 2019 Brave New World 2.0, coproduction Noord Nederlands Toneel, Slagwerk Den Haag and Asko| Schönberg
 2018 Tetris Mon Amour, coproduction with Slagwerk Den Haag, music bij Thijs de vlieger (NOISIA) 
 2018 Salam, coproduction Noord Nederlands Toneel, Club Guy & Roni, Asko|Schönberg
 2017 Carrousel, coproduction Noord Nederlands Toneel, Club Guy & Roni, Asko|Schönbergs 
 2016 Happiness, coproduction with Slagwerk Den Haag
 2015	Phobia, coproduction with EN-KNAP (SI) and Slagwerk Den Haag
 2015	Sparks, Festival Classique, was broadcast live on Dutch national television. In cooperation with The Hague Philharmonic (Residentie Orkest)
 2015	Mechanical Ecstasy, with musicians of Slagwerk Den Haag, music composition by Jan-Bas Bollen and Thijs de Vlieger (NOISIA).
 2014 	My Private Odyssey, coproduction with tanzmainz / Staatstheater Mainz (DE) and musicians Tomoko Mukaiyama, Monica Germino and Anne La Berge. Music composition David Dramm and Tomoko Mukaiyama.
 2014	Gift for Infinity (RUG), performance 400 year anniversary of the Groningen University with Noord Nederlands Orkest, WERC video collective and media artist Jan Klug.
 2013 	Naked Lunch, coproduction with the musicians of Slagwerk Den Haag and vocalists of Silbersee. Music composition Yannis Kyriakides. Text by Oscar van Woensel.
 2013	CRASH, coproduction with NNT
 2013	L’Histoire du Soldat, with musicians of Lunapark
 2012	Midnight Rising, with the Israeli singer-songwriter Ehud Banai
 2011	Miraculous Wednesday, coproduction with State Theater Oldenburg (DE)
 2010	Alpha Boys
 2010	Four Walls
 2010	FKK
 2009	Heelhuids & Halsoverkop, coproduction with NNT
 2009	Desert Highway
 2009	Pinball and Grace
 2008	Poetic Disasters
 2007	Myrrh and Cinnamon
 2005	Language of Walls

Guest choreographer / director  
 2015	Noord Nederlands Toneel (NL) - De Twaalf Gezworenen
 2014	Staatstheater Oldenburg (DE) - Finale Grande
 2014	Theatre Ballet Moscow (RU) - OpArt 
 2013	Staatstheater Oldenburg (DE) - Romeo et Juliette
 2013	The Göteborg Opera (SE) – Mama I'm Coming Home
 2011	Tsekh Contemporary Dance Centre, Moscow (RU) - L'Histoire du Soldat
 2010	Staatstheater Oldenburg (DE) - Air Ways
 2009	Carte Blanche, Bergen (NO) – When Clarity Visits
 2009	Schauspiel Kölln (DE) - 60 Years
 2007	Scapino Ballet (NL) – Bowler's Heaven
 2002	Ballet du Nord (FR) – Silence pas de Silence
 1999	Galili Dance (NL) – In Remains

References

External links 
 Website of Club Guy & Roni

1973 births
Living people
Israeli choreographers
Israeli male dancers